was a district located in Yamanashi Prefecture, Japan.

On March 15, 2006, the town of Kobuchisawa was merged into the expanded city of Hokuto. Kitakoma District was dissolved as a result of this merger.

Timeline
 1878: The district was formed out from the former Koma District.
 September 1, 2004 - The town of Futaba was merged with the towns of Ryūō and Shikishima (both from Nakakoma District) to create the city of Kai.
 November 1, 2004 - The towns of Hakushū, Nagasaka, Sutama and Takane, and the villages of Akeno, Mukawa and Ōizumi were merged to create the city of Hokuto
 March 15, 2006 - The town of Kobuchisawa was merged into the expanded city of Hokuto. Kitakoma District was dissolved as a result of this merger.

Former districts of Yamanashi Prefecture